U-106 may refer to one of the following German submarines:

 During the First World War, Germany also had this submarine with a similar name:
 , a Type UB III submarine launched in 1917 and surrendered on 26 November 1918; dumped on beach at Falmouth after explosive trials 1921 and broken up in situ
 , a Type IXB submarine that served in the Second World War until sunk on 2 August 1943

Submarines of Germany